Jeremy Thrush (born 19 April 1985) is a rugby union lock who plays for the Western Force. He represented the Junior All Blacks, New Zealand Under-19 and New Zealand Secondary Schools teams. He was a part of the victorious 2004 Under-19 World Championship team and was named the 2004 IRB World U19 Player of the Year.

Thrush made his debut as a replacement in the 68th minute of the All Blacks' second test against France in the 2013 Steinlager Series. On 13 January 2015, it was announced that Thrush would be joining Aviva Premiership side Gloucester after the 2015 Rugby World Cup.

On 10 May 2018, Thrush returned to the southern hemisphere in Australia to sign for Western Force as part of the Global Rapid Rugby competition and recently played for them in Super Rugby AU and Super Rugby Pacific.

References

External links
Gloucester Rugby Profile

Hurricanes Profile
Wellington Lions Profile
itsrugby.co.uk Profile

Rugby union locks
1985 births
Living people
New Zealand rugby union players
Hurricanes (rugby union) players
Wellington rugby union players
New Zealand international rugby union players
Rugby union players from Auckland
People educated at Hutt Valley High School
Gloucester Rugby players
New Zealand expatriate rugby union players
New Zealand expatriate sportspeople in England
Expatriate rugby union players in England
Western Force players